Soulstar is a hybrid rail shooter/third-person shooter video game developed and originally published by Core Design for the Sega CD in Europe in April 1994, then in North America by Time Warner Interactive in September, and later in Japan by Victor Entertainment on December 22.

When the ancient Myrkoids alien race arrive upon the titular solar system to drain its planets from their resources and destroy them, it is up to Bryk Hammelt of the Cryo-Commandos warrior race to eliminate the Myrkoids by piloting his morphing fighter craft named the Aggressor. As the penultimate title developed by Core Design for the Sega CD, Soulstar features heavy use of the scaling and rotation capabilities of the add-on, similar with other titles on the system created by the same developer such as Thunderhawk and Battlecorps, which featured the same pseudo-3D graphical style. It is inspired by Sega's 1988 arcade game Galaxy Force II.

Upon release, Soulstar received praise from critics for its technical achievement on the hardware, soundtrack and multiple playstyles, though it received criticism for the repetitive gameplay. Nevertheless, the game was named "Best Shooter" on the Sega CD by GameFan. Ports for the 32X, Atari Jaguar CD and PC were in development by Core Design, but they were never released.

Gameplay 

Soulstar is a shooter game that is primarily played in a third-person perspective behind the ship, similar to Galaxy Force II and Star Fox, where players take the role of Bryk Hammelt from the Cryo-Commandos in a mission to exterminate the alien race known as the Myrkoids, who have arrived on the titular Soulstar system to invade it. The gameplay is based around three types of space combat vehicles that the player's ship, the Aggressor, can transform into depending on the situation.

The first mode is an on rails shoot 'em up akin to Space Harrier, where it involves flying the Sub-light Strike Craft through space towards huge scaling sprites of a planet or space station and flying across a texture mapped planetscape, while shooting upcoming enemies from either the front or behind and collecting power-ups along the way.

The second mode involves controlling the Turbo Copter hovercraft in environments of 360°, allowing players to roam freely across the map on missions that take place in indoor or outdoor areas. In this mode, players are tasked with eliminating primary targets within the area, which are displayed before the start of each level at the mission briefing screen. A notable feature of the game is how the difficulty level is selected: After entering the second level and destroying the boss of the area, there are three warp gates that players can activate, each one representing a fixed level of difficulty of the game (from Easy to Hard) and a set number of levels to go through. At the end of each level set, the player returns to the space station to choose a remaining warp gate.

The third mode is similar to the Turbo Copter mode in terms of gameplay, but this time players control the Combat Walker mecha, which is capable of dashing along the ground and hover above the terrain for a brief period of time. Each vehicle in the three gameplay modes offer a different control scheme and functions. The game also has a two-player cooperative mode, where the first player pilots the spaceship, while the second players acts as an air gunner aiming at the enemies.

Plot 
The Myrkoids, an ancient alien species with a cold and unified mind have descended upon many star systems, stealing and draining every planet of their resources and destroying them in the process. Following the destruction of his home system, Bryk Hammelt, the last from a noble warrior race known as the Cryo-Commandos, sets out in his morphing starship, the Aggressor, to hunt down and eradicate the Myrkoids from existence, who have arrived at the Soulstar system to repeat their same process of planetary extermination.

Development 

Soulstar was conceived by Mark Avory (now Sarah Jane Avory) after work on the Sega CD port of Thunderhawk was completed. Mark had the desire to develop a project similar to Galaxy Force II, as it was one of his favorite titles in arcades, but no existing hardware released at the time on the market was capable of producing visuals of similar fidelity until the arrival of the Sega CD in 1991, which allowed Mark and one of his co-workers to make their vision a reality. The project began development in March 1993, two months after Thunderhawk was released in North America on Sega CD and was announced in late 1993 under the original name Aggressor and later as Soulstar: Malice of The Myrkoids in early 1994, along with other then-upcoming titles for the add-on by Core Design such as Battlecorps, Heimdall and BC Racers (then titled Chuck Rally).

Soulstar makes intensive use of the features available on the Sega CD hardware for its visuals, in addition to being the first title on the add-on that displayed sprites at 64 colors. Mark and his team planned on pushing the hardware as much as they could from the beginning of its development, with all of the sprites featured in the game being built on the system's WRAM as "stamp maps" in order to be displayed on-screen by the Sega Genesis, in addition to creating a display list to showcase up to 80 moving sprites. Mark also integrated a graphical trick that allowed both the sprites and terrain to exhibit color depth-fading. The soundtrack composed by Nathan McCree was implemented early in development and enters synchronization with gameplay during the Sub-light Strike Craft sections. Both Battlecorps and Soulstar shared the same game engine as with Thunderhawk on the Sega CD.

Release 
Soulstar was first was showcased during the Winter Consumer Electronics Show in 1994, with early previews showing elements that are not present in the final release. The game was first released in Europe in April, featuring the option of choosing between different languages for in-game options and text. The title was later brought to North America by Time Warner Interactive in September, with the language options being removed from this release. It was also published during the same year in Japan by Victor Entertainment on December 22, with all the in-game text left entirely in English.

Soulstar X 
A version of the game for the Sega 32X, titled Soulstar X, was in development by Core Design and announced in 1995. Originally planned for an April 1995 release and later planned to be launched on Autumn/August, this version was set to feature improved gameplay and new weapons, in addition to sporting pre-rendered graphics and sprites at 256 colors that were created by using the Wavefront graphics software program found on Silicon Graphics (SGI) workstations, instead of the original hand-drawn look on Sega CD but was ultimately never released due to the commercial failure of the add-on. On February 20, 2010, a ROM image of an early but playable prototype of Soulstar X for the 32X was leaked online by a video game collector at the SEGASaturno forums.

A port of Soulstar X to the PC was also planned and in development by Core Design, but never released.

Atari Jaguar CD version 

A port of Soulstar for the Atari Jaguar CD was also in development by Core Design and announced during the same time along with Soulstar X for the 32X. This version was set to feature the same pre-rendered sprites as with the 32X version but with reworked graphics compared to the Sega CD original, in addition to redone FMV sequences while retaining the same gameplay found on the original version, albeit at a faster frame rate. In a February 1995 interview by Atari Explorer Online with former Core Design employee Andrew Smith, he stated that work on the port was almost finished but not without the team coming across with issues found within the system's multi-chip architecture, in order to meet a strict time limit for completion. Andrew also said that they were open with the idea of porting the title to the Atari Jaguar, but suggesting that some elements would need to be omitted for a possible cartridge release, and that the idea would also need to be proven viable for Atari Corporation. It was first shown during Spring ECTS '95 and was originally planned for a Q2 1995 release.

Soulstar for the Jaguar CD was then showcased during E3 1995 along with Soulstar X, and now planned for an August/Q3 1995 release. Though internal documents from Atari Corp. listed the port as in development and later advertised to be launched in late 1995, the port was ultimately never released with no explanation given in regards to its cancellation. Although Andrew Smith stated that the company did have some titles from their catalog listed to be converted for the Jaguar, with Susan Lusty of Core Design stating at WCES '95 that both Swagman and Tomb Raider were planned to be released for the add-on, Core's PR manager Susie Hamilton later clarified in 1999 that Soulstar was their only title in development for the platform.

An ISO image of a playable build of the Jaguar CD version was leaked sometime online, but gameplay is very prone to glitches and game-crashing bugs. A bootleg copy of this version was seen running at the fan festival Jaguar Connexion 2005. In recent years, video game collector and community member Matt Smith has uploaded a full playthrough from an almost complete build of the Jaguar CD version on YouTube, with plans to be released online for download in the future.

Reception

Pre-release 
In their April 1994 issue, Electronic Gaming Monthly gave a positive remark to the game by stating that "fans of the Galaxy Force series of games will be pleased to see the creation of this great looking CD!". Dave Halverson of GameFan also gave positive remarks to the title. GamePro gave a positive remark to the game as well when it was showcased at WCES '94, praising the graphics, music and variety.

Post-release 

Soulstar got mixed-to-positive response upon release. GamePro gave the game a mixed review, saying that the graphics and audio are impressive, but had a mixed opinion for gameplay. They also commented that the steep difficulty curve makes the game unsuitable for novice gamers.

References

External links 
 Soulstar at GameFAQs
 Soulstar at Giant Bomb
 Soulstar at MobyGames

1994 video games
Cancelled Atari Jaguar games
Cancelled PC games
Cancelled Sega 32X games
Cooperative video games
Core Design games
Multiplayer and single-player video games
Rail shooters
Science fiction video games
Sega CD games
Sega CD-only games
Third-person shooters
Video games developed in the United Kingdom
Video games scored by Nathan McCree
Video games set in outer space
Time Warner Interactive games